Saint Xavier University (or SXU) is a private Roman Catholic university in Chicago, Illinois. Founded in 1846 by the Sisters of Mercy, the university enrolls 3,749 students.

History 
Saint Xavier University was founded as a women's college by the Sisters of Mercy in 1846 at the request of Bishop William Quarter. With the City of Chicago less than 10 years old, the religious sisters, under the guidance of Mother Mary Francis Xavier Warde, R.S.M., established Saint Francis Xavier Female Academy. The Academy, which would later become Saint Xavier College, and finally Saint Xavier University, was the first Mercy College in the world and is the oldest chartered college in the city of Chicago.

In the year 1846, five sisters of Mercy were sent to the city of Chicago from Pittsburgh to start Catholic work in the new city.  The original campus (then referred to as an academy), soon gains, in 1947, the state charter which allowed for the granting on degrees from the academy.  After this location  (Wabash Avenue between Madison and Monroe in downtown Chicago) was burned down in the Great Chicago Fire of 1871, the campus was rebuilt on the southern boundary of Chicago.

In 1915 the sisters of mercy's hard work to open a college women becomes reality when the school becomes an official college, teaching "all branches of higher learning"

Academics 
Saint Xavier University offers undergraduate majors and graduate programs through their three schools:

 The College of Arts and Sciences
 The Graham School of Management
 The School of Nursing and Health Sciences (a recognized Center of Excellence by the National League for Nursing)

Saint Xavier University has one of the most diverse undergraduate student bodies in Chicago and is a federally-designated Hispanic-serving institution.

Campuses

Chicago 
Saint Xavier's  main campus is located in City of Chicago in the Mt. Greenwood neighborhood on the corner of 103rd Street and Central Park Avenue. It is in close proximity to the suburb of Evergreen Park, Illinois.

The university's main campus is made up of several buildings, including the Warde Academic Center, which is the oldest building on campus and houses administrative offices and the library; the Shannon Center; McDonough Chapel, a small Catholic chapel; the Graham School of Management Building; Andrew Conference Center and Driehaus Center. Within a mile of the main campus are the Visual Arts Center and O'Grady Center, which houses the departments of University Relations and University Advancement.

In 2001, an influx of students to the University led to the opening of four new dormitories on campus. Residence halls listed below;

 McCarthy Hall (opened 2001)
 Morris Hall (opened 2002)
 O'Brien Hall (opened 2008)
 Pacelli Hall (opened 1959)
 Rubloff Hall (opened 2006)

In 2009, former Chicago Mayor Richard M. Daley recognized Saint Xavier University for its eco-friendly efforts with the opening of the Arthur Rubloff Hall and O'Brien Halls on campus.  These residence halls are environmentally friendly, featuring rooftop gardens and clean-source alternative energy.

In 2021, Saint Xavier celebrated its 175th anniversary and received an official state resolution honoring its legacy in Chicago.

Athletics 
The Saint Xavier (SXU) athletic teams are called the Cougars. The university is a member of the National Association of Intercollegiate Athletics (NAIA), primarily competing in the Chicagoland Collegiate Athletic Conference (CCAC) in most of its sports since the 1973–74 academic year; while its football team competes in the Midwest League of the Mid-States Football Association (MSFA).

SXU competes in 19 intercollegiate varsity sports: Men's sports include baseball, basketball, bowling, cross country, football, golf, soccer, track & field and volleyball; women's sports include basketball, bowling, cross country, golf, soccer, softball, track & field and volleyball; and co-ed sports include cheerleading and dance.

Coaches 
The baseball team is coached by Addison Rouse. The football team is coached by Mike Feminis.

Facilities 
Athletic facilities on campus include the Shannon Center, which holds up to 3,500 students and houses the university fitness center. It is home to both men's and women's basketball and volleyball teams. Bruce R. Deaton Memorial Field is home to football, soccer, and track.

Accomplishments 
In 2011, Saint Xavier won the NAIA Football National Championship.

References

External links 
 
 Official athletics website

 
Universities and colleges in Chicago
Educational institutions established in 1846
Sisters of Mercy colleges and universities
Association of Catholic Colleges and Universities
Former women's universities and colleges in the United States
1846 establishments in Illinois
Catholic universities and colleges in Illinois